The Chicago Challenge was a golf tournament on the LPGA Tour from 1991 to 1994. It was played in the Chicago, Illinois area: at the Oak Brook Golf Club in Oak Brook in 1991 and at the White Eagle Golf Club in Naperville from 1992 to 1994. The title sponsor for the first three years was the Chicago Sun-Times.

Winners
Chicago Challenge
1994 Jane Geddes

Sun-Times Challenge
1993 Cindy Schreyer
1992 Dottie Mochrie

LPGA Chicago Sun-Times Shoot-Out
1991 Martha Nause

References

External links
White Eagle Golf Club

Former LPGA Tour events
Golf in Illinois
Recurring sporting events established in 1991
Recurring events established in 1994
1991 establishments in Illinois
1994 disestablishments in Illinois
History of women in Illinois
1990s in Chicago